Kenya dwarf gecko could refer to the following species:

 Lygodactylus keniensis, also known as Parker's dwarf gecko
 Lygodactylus grandisonae, also known as Grandison’s dwarf gecko or Bunty’s dwarf gecko